{{Infobox election
| election_name = 2004 United States Senate election in Missouri
| country = Missouri
| type = presidential
| ongoing = no
| previous_election = 1998 United States Senate election in Missouri
| previous_year = 1998
| next_election = 2010 United States Senate election in Missouri
| next_year = 2010
| election_date = November 2, 2004
| image_size = 
| image1 = 
| nominee1 = Kit Bond
| party1 = Republican Party (United States)
| popular_vote1 = 1,518,089
| percentage1 = 56.1%
| image2 = 
| nominee2 = Nancy Farmer
| party2 = Democratic Party (United States)
| popular_vote2 = 1,158,261
| percentage2 = 42.8%
| map_image = 2004 United States Senate election in Missouri results map by county.svg
| map_size = 275px
| map_caption = County results Bond:     Farmer:  
| title = U.S. Senator
| before_election = Kit Bond
| before_party = Republican Party (United States)
| after_election = Kit Bond
| after_party = Republican Party (United States)
}}

The 2004 United States Senate election in Missouri''' was held November 2, 2004. Incumbent Republican U.S. Senator Kit Bond won re-election to a fourth term.

Democratic primary

Results 
 Nancy Farmer, State Treasurer of Missouri, former Missouri State Representative
 Charles Berry, Vietnam War veteran, teacher
 Ronald Bonar, perennial candidate

Results

Libertarian primary

Candidates
 Kevin Tull, activist

Results

Republican primary

Candidates 
 Kit Bond, incumbent U.S. Senator since 1987
 Mike Steger

Results

General election

Candidates 
 Kit Bond (R), incumbent U.S. Senator
 Nancy Farmer (D), State Treasurer of Missouri and former State Representative
 Don Griffin (C)
 Kevin Tull (L), activist

Predictions

Polling

Results

See also 
 2004 United States Senate elections

Notes

References

2004 Missouri elections
2004
Missouri